Särklass C is a sailing class with about 30 boats built between 1937 and 1956.

See also
Hai
Särklass A

References

Development sailing classes
Keelboats